Melodies Old and New is a 1942 Our Gang short comedy film directed by Edward Cahn. It was the 203rd Our Gang short (204th episode, 115th talking short, 116th talking episode, and 35th MGM produced episode) that was released.

Plot
The gang prevails upon old-time minstrel impresario Uncle Wills to help them stage a fund-raising musical show (as they did in Ye Olde Minstrels). Highlights include the ensemble number "When Grandma Wore a Bustle", the barbershop-quartet set piece "Songs of Long Ago", and the grand finale "Dances Old and New". The kids are unable to post the profits because Mickey has allowed most of the audience to enter for free, but Uncle Wills comes to the rescue once again.

Cast

The Gang
 Janet Burston as Janet
 Mickey Gubitosi as Mickey
 Billy Laughlin as Froggy
 George McFarland as Spanky
 Billie Thomas as Buckwheat

Additional cast
 Walter Wills as Uncle Walt Wills

Dancers and audience members
Lavonne Battle, Shiela Brown, Shirley Jean Doble, Donna Jean Edmondson, Eddie Ehrhardt, James Gubitosi, Dwayne Hickman, Dickie Humphries, Robert Morris, Kay Tapscott, Frank Lester Ward, Patricia Wheeler

See also
 Our Gang filmography

References

External links

1942 films
1942 comedy films
American black-and-white films
Films directed by Edward L. Cahn
Metro-Goldwyn-Mayer short films
Our Gang films
1942 short films
1940s American films